An Stac is the name of a 814 m mountain in the Northwest Highlands, Scotland, on the shore of Loch Ailort on the west coast of Lochaber. A steep-sided conical peak, the mountain is usually climbed in conjunction with its higher neighbour Rois-bheinn. The nearest settlement is the hamlet of Lochailort.

References

Mountains and hills of the Northwest Highlands
Marilyns of Scotland
Corbetts